Stamford may refer to:

Places

Australia

 Stamford, Queensland, Australia, a town and location in the Shire of Flinders

Canada 

 Stamford Township, Ontario, a former township first in Upper Canada, then in Canada

United Kingdom
Stamford, Lincolnshire, a town and civil parish in England
Stamford (UK Parliament constituency), a former constituency in Lincolnshire, England
Stamford A.F.C., an association football club
Stamford Bridge, a village in the East Riding of Yorkshire, England
Stamford Brook, a brook in West London
Stamford Canal, Lincolnshire

United States
Stamford, Connecticut, the largest and most populous city named Stamford
Stamford Transportation Center, called "Stamford" by railway companies, located in the above city
Stamford, Nebraska, a village
Stamford, New York, a town
Stamford (village), New York 
Stamford, South Dakota
Stamford, Texas, a city
Stamford, Vermont, a town
Lake Stamford, a reservoir in Texas

People
Stamford Raffles (1781–1826), English statesman and founder of Singapore
Stamford Raffles-Flint (1847–1925), Archdeacon of Cornwall

Educational institutions
Stamford University (Bangladesh)  
Stamford University (Thailand)  
Stamford University (England), 1333-1335
Stamford School, an English public school situated in the market town of Stamford, Lincolnshire
Stamford American International School, Singapore
Stamford High School (disambiguation)

Other uses
The Earl of Stamford, created in 1628, an extinct title in the Peerage of England
Stamford Street, London, England
Stamford Road, Singapore
, an authorized but never built US Navy frigate
Swissôtel The Stamford, a hotel in Singapore

See also
Samford (disambiguation)
Stamford Bridge (disambiguation)
Stanford (disambiguation)